Géry-Jacques-Charles Leuliet (12 January 1910 – 1 January 2015) was a French prelate of the Roman Catholic Church and at the time of his death, was the oldest bishop of the Catholic Church, at 104 years of age.

Leuliet was born in France and was ordained to the priesthood on 8 July 1933 in the Roman Catholic Diocese of Arras. He was appointed Bishop of Amiens on February 14, 1963 and received his episcopal consecration on 9 May 1963. Leuliet retired as the bishop's dean in France on 15 January 1985. Upon the death of Nguyen Van Thien on 13 May 2012 he became the oldest living Roman Catholic bishop. He died 11 days before his 105th birthday on 1 January 2015.

Notes

External links
Catholic-Hierarchy
Diocese Site  (French)

1910 births
2015 deaths
Participants in the Second Vatican Council
20th-century Roman Catholic bishops in France
Bishops of Amiens
French centenarians
Men centenarians